Aboubacar Tigre Kone (born 28 March 2001) is an Ivorian-born Belgian footballer who plays as a defender.

Career statistics

Club

Notes

References

2001 births
Living people
Belgian footballers
Belgian expatriate footballers
Belgium youth international footballers
Association football defenders
Beerschot A.C. players
PSV Eindhoven players
Fujairah FC players
Al Urooba Club players
UAE Pro League players
UAE First Division League players
Belgian expatriate sportspeople in the Netherlands
Expatriate footballers in the Netherlands
Belgian expatriate sportspeople in the United Arab Emirates
Expatriate footballers in the United Arab Emirates
People from Gagnoa